Margit Szobi (born 21 May 1951) is a Hungarian former archer who competed in the 1980 Summer Olympic Games.

Olympics

She competed in the women's individual event at the 1980 Summer Olympic Games and finished 21st with a score of 2216 points.

References

External links 
 Profile on worldarchery.org

1951 births
Living people
Hungarian female archers
Olympic archers of Hungary
Archers at the 1980 Summer Olympics